Iowa Lake Township is one of twelve townships in Emmet County, Iowa, USA.  As of the 2000 census, its population was 145.

Geography
According to the United States Census Bureau, Iowa Lake Township covers an area of 28.66 square miles (74.24 square kilometers); of this, 28.08 square miles (72.74 square kilometers, 97.98 percent) is land and 0.58 square miles (1.5 square kilometers, 2.02 percent) is water.

Adjacent townships
 Eagle Township, Kossuth County (east)
 Swea Township, Kossuth County (southeast)
 Armstrong Grove Township (south)
 Swan Lake Township (southwest)
 Lincoln Township (west)

Major highways
  Iowa Highway 15

School districts
 Armstrong-Ringsted Community School District

Political districts
 Iowa's 4th congressional district
 State House District 7
 State Senate District 4

References
 United States Census Bureau 2008 TIGER/Line Shapefiles
 United States Board on Geographic Names (GNIS)
 United States National Atlas

External links
 US-Counties.com
 City-Data.com

Townships in Emmet County, Iowa
Townships in Iowa